Class E was a series of Großprofil (wide profile) multiple units of Berliner Verkehrsbetriebe (BVG) which was exclusively used on East Berlin line E, today line U5 of the Berlin U-Bahn. Except for the two prototypes, all vehicles were built using parts of retired S-Bahn vehicles, namely the bogies and parts of the electrical equipment.

History
As part of the German reparations after World War II, Berliner Verkehrsbetriebe had to cede 120 vehicles of Class C to Moscow Metro. This type was of particular interest for Moscow as it was the newest class on the Berlin network, and technically very similar to the Moscow class A which had been modelled after it.

Hence, a shortage of rolling stock of class E (in the Soviet sector, later East Berlin) was newest wide profile line which had been operated exclusively with Class C stock. To continue services of this route, Kleinprofil (narrow profile) vehicles of Class AI were transferred from route U2 and had wooden running boards, popularly called Blumenbretter ("flower shelves"), attached to their sides. These trains were designated AI K. 40 trains were being re-deployed to route E. These "Blumenbretter" trains were also deployed on route D during the East German uprising of 1953.

As a continued operation of narrow profile cars on the wide profile line was economically not viable in the long run, BVG commissioned a new class, later designated E, for Berlin U-Bahn. Only the subtypes EI (prototype) and EIII (converted S-Bahn vehicles) were built. Most of the trains were built using parts of DRG Class ET 165, DRG Class ET 168 and DRG Class ET 169.

EI trains
Prototypes of a new class of U-Bahn trains were drawn up beginning in 1952, and after the West Berlin BVG permitted to take exact measurements and detailed photographs of one of their Class C vehicles in 1954, LOWA in Ammendorf designed and built two new motor cars from 1955 to 1957. Until 1956 these were simply known as 18-Meter-Wagen (18 metre cars), after consultation with BVG West who developed their Class D at the same time as Class E. The electrical equipment was supplied and installed by LEW Hennigsdorf.

The new vehicles were a steel frame construction with a rounded roof and four double sliding doors for passengers on each side. There were also doors for the driver and escape doors at the non-driving ends. Instead of ventilation flaps in the windows, pressure ventilation was used. Each car had four motors of 100 kW each, rheostatic brakes and electrically controlled pneumatic brakes. Scharfenberg couplers were used, and the vehicles were equipped with multiple unit traction control.

Because of the steel construction, the vehicles weighed almost 40 tonnes each and were, therefore, heavier than those of Class C. This and various other shortcomings were the reason why no production models of those trains were built. Although the RAW in Schöneweide was tasked with fixing some of the faults and building two matching trailers, a lack of capacity prevented this, and the vehicles were stabled in 1961. One was later used as a storage room, the other as a mess room for apprentices. In late 1988, both cars were scrapped.

EII trains
While Class EI was designed and built, BVG already planned an improved Class EII as a lightweight construction based on the experiences with the prototypes and with BVG Class D. Waggonbau Ammendorf was tasked with the design on 18 February 1959. The dimensions differed only little from those of the vehicles of the Moscow Metro, signifying plans to export such cars. After the border to West Berlin was closed on 13 August 1961, the traffic flows in Berlin changed such that passenger numbers on Route A significantly increased, and the vehicles transferred to route E were now missing on the narrow profile route. Hence, the plans for an EII type train were dropped in 1962. A faster and easier option was the conversion of S-Bahn vehicles which had become surplus to demand because of the boycott of the S-Bahn in West Berlin. This resulted in the numerous Class EIII.

EIII trains

Batch 1

The project began in the summer of 1962. Six trains of the S-Bahn type 168 were converted in the Reichsbahnausbesserungswerk Schöneweide (RAW) until the end of 1962. All in all, five batches of this new U-Bahn train type, called EIII, were delivered.

Batch 2

The Kleinprofil trains could finally be moved back from the E line to the A line, which sorely needed the trains due to a very large number of passengers on the segment between Schönhauser Allee and Alexanderplatz.

The fleet numbering system was changed from 14xx to 10x (Triebwagen) and 15x (Beiwagen) series for the trains.

Batch 3

Construction began for the extension of Line E from Friedrichsfelde to Tierpark, to serve the Tierpark Zoo there. In order to increase the capacity for the extension, BVB had to get 4 trains from the DR Class 275. These trains were converted between 9 September 1972 and 25 January 1973.

Batch 4

After the opening of Tierpark station, there was a need to increase capacity on the Line E. Therefore, BVB had to convert five more trains which is from the DR Class 275. These trains were delivered between 1975 and 1982.

Batch 5

BVB had the need to order new trains because of the extension of line E from Tierpark to the Hellersdorf area and Hönow. BVB had contracted several trains from the Berlin S-Bahn and those selected D57/D60 units from the BVG which was originally destined to be scrapped. The first two prototypes started delivery in May 1986 before the subsequent delivery in September 1986. The condition was later reversed. For safety reasons, the ceilings of the manufacturer plate was given after the trains were burnt out at Klosterstraße station. 25 double-end cars were also added into the fleet for the D class trains, whereas the remainder of 41 were line E. The last of these trains were delivered before September 1990, just before Die Wende.

EIV trains
The GDR or the BVB had already planned further. Although it had developed over 40 years, many parts of these train came mostly from S-Bahn trains which were built in the 1920s and the 1930s, and thus was very old. On the other hand, enormous efforts have been made by the industry to develop a modern S-Bahn train. This then succeeded so well with the DR Class 270 (now DBAG Class 485), which were produced in the years 1987-92 for Deutsche Reichsbahn. In LEW Hennigsdorf in the 1980s there were already plans for a new subway train for large profile line E as the successor to the E-III trains. They had dimensioned the timeframe so that the mid-90s should be started with the delivery of this thoroughly modern trains. These trains were to be installed with AC drive, among other things, which would have been a novelty for local trains in the GDR. Design studies for this new type of train were abandoned in 1990.

Accidents
Over the years, the EIII has repeatedly suffered minor accidents and damage. In addition there were four major accidents in the period from 1972 to 1992, although, as a rule, only property damage arose.

In March 1972 there was a rear-end collision in the Lichtenberg subway station, the train 101   040 was damaged. It was rebuilt until 1974 at RAW Schöneweide.

On 13 January 1980 traction truck 101 escaped in the sweeping station at Alexanderplatz subway station. The car was rebuilt until March 1980 in Raw Schöneweide and derailed again in January 1981 in the same place. Reconstruction took place until December 1982 in the context of a major investigation.

On 21 October 1992, there was a rear-end collision between the Kaulsdorf-Nord and Berlin Wuhletal stations involving DI cars 110 318 and the EIII car 101 015/151 015. As the retirement of the EIII/4 had already been decided in the near future, the vehicle was not rebuilt.

After reunification
In 1992, when the BVB was re-unified with the BVG (West) to form BVG, the trains were progressively renumbered from 10x and 15x series, into the 18xx and 19xx. Most of the trains were also serviced in the Wannsee depot in the meantime before transferring to the reunified Deutsche Bahn on 1 January 1994. The management board of the BVG decided to replace the EIII cars into the new millennium with the new Class F cars.

This allowed phasing out of the trains to target those beyond EIII.4 cars. According to some sources, some trains were to be sold to Warsaw Metro after the retirement, but these plans did not materialise. This would also be a modernisation of the trains such that trains will have BOStrab. The vehicles had received no major studies, the last unit 1818/1819 left on 11 January 1993 from the Raw in this state.

Originally the BVG wanted to keep the EIII trains until 1999, but because of enormous operating and maintenance costs after the reunification of Germany, the EIII trains were retired as early as 1994. There were plans to use up the EIII/4 of the lifespan until 1995, and the EIII/5 and EIII/5U until 2000. Since the necessary spare vehicles for the Class F were not ready, the BVG proceeded to redeploy more trains to the U8 and reduce the number of trains of U5, until the Class H trains were delivered.

The trains were not designed for use in magnetically secured routes. Some of the aspects include relatively sedate driving techniques. There had been attempts to test the EIII trains on other lines, however this failed. The actual last day of operation is 16 July 1994. The last trains were 1830/1831+1810/1811+1842/1843 and 1916/1917+1914/1915+1908/1909, running from Alexanderplatz to Hönow.

References

Berlin U-Bahn
Electric multiple units of Germany
Train-related introductions in 1958